Toral Mais oğlu Bayramov (born 23 February 2001) is an Azerbaijani footballer who plays as a left-back or a winger for Qarabağ FK in the Azerbaijan Premier League and the Azerbaijan national football team.

Club career
Bayramov made his debut for Qarabağ on 23 September 2019, in the Azerbaijan Premier League match against Zira.

International career
He made his debut for Azerbaijan national football team on 27 May 2021 in a friendly against Turkey.

Honours
Qarabağ
 Azerbaijan Premier League: 2019–20

References

External links
 
 Toral Bayramov at www.uefa.com

2001 births
Living people
Association football midfielders
Azerbaijani footballers
Qarabağ FK players
Azerbaijan Premier League players
Azerbaijan international footballers
Azerbaijan under-21 international footballers
Azerbaijan youth international footballers